Mourad Meziane (born September 21, 1964 in Oran) is a former Algerian international football player. He played in MC Oran and was a president of the club between 2003 and 2006.

Honours

Clubs
MC Oran
Algerian Championship: 1987–88, 1991–92, 1992–93; Runner-up 1984–85, 1986–87, 1989–90, 1994–95, 1995–96, 1996–97
Algerian Cup: 1983–84, 1984–85, 1995–96; Runner-up 1997–98
Algerian League Cup: 1996
Algerian Super Cup: Runner-up 1992
Arab Cup Winners' Cup: 1997
African Cup of Champions Clubs: Runner-up 1989

ASM Oran
Algerian Championship 2: 1999–00

Individual
African Cup of Champions Clubs goalscorer: 1989 with 6 goals

Statistics

Club statistics

International goals

Notes and references

External links 
 Player statistics - fifa.com
 Player profile - dzfootball

1964 births
Living people
Algerian footballers
Algeria international footballers
Footballers from Oran
MC Oran players
Al-Wehda Club (Mecca) players
ASM Oran players
Association football forwards
21st-century Algerian people